Trendon Nelson Watford (born November 9, 2000) is an American professional basketball player for the Portland Trail Blazers of the National Basketball Association (NBA). He played college basketball for the LSU Tigers.

High school career
Watford began his high school basketball playing career for Shades Valley High School in Irondale, Alabama while attending Irondale Middle School before moving to Mountain Brook, Alabama where he played high school basketball for Mountain Brook High School from his freshman year to senior year. A highly touted five star prospect, Watford holds many Alabama state records, among these is the Alabama High School Athletic Association’s career rebounding record. He led Mountain Brook to three consecutive Class 7A state championships from 2017 to 2019.

Recruiting
On May 20, 2019, he committed to Will Wade and LSU.

College career
In his debut for LSU, an 88–79 win over Bowling Green, Watford scored 10 points. He had his first double double in college on November 19, 2019, scoring 12 points and grabbing 12 rebounds as LSU defeated UMBC 77–50. Watford scored a career-high 22 points on January 25, 2020, in a 69–67 win over Texas. At the conclusion of the regular season, Watford was named to the SEC All-Freshman Team. He averaged 13.6 points and 7.2 rebounds for LSU as a freshman. Following the season, Watford declared for the 2020 NBA draft. On August 3, Watford announced he was returning to LSU for his sophomore season. He scored a career-high 30 points in a SEC Tournament championship game loss to Alabama. Watford averaged 16.3 points and 7.4 rebounds per game as a sophomore. Following the season, he declared for the 2021 NBA draft and hired an agent, thus forgoing his college eligibility.

Professional career
After going undrafted in the 2021 NBA draft, Watford was signed by the Portland Trail Blazers to a two-way contract on August 3, 2021. His contract was converted to a standard deal on February 21, 2022. On March 12, he scored a season-high 27 points, along with six rebounds, in a 127–118 win over the Washington Wizards.

On July 17, 2022, Watford put up 19 points, seven rebounds, two assists, three steals, and one block, to lead the Blazers to an 85–77 win over the New York Knicks in the 2022 NBA Summer League championship match. He was later named the Summer League Championship Game MVP. Watford was also named to the All-NBA Summer League Second Team.

Career statistics

NBA

|-
| style="text-align:left;"| 
| style="text-align:left;"| Portland
| 48 || 10 || 18.1 || .532 || .237 || .755 || 4.1 || 1.7 || .5 || .6 || 7.6
|- class="sortbottom"
| style="text-align:center;" colspan="2"| Career
| 48 || 10 || 18.1 || .532 || .237 || .755 || 4.1 || 1.7 || .5 || .6 || 7.6

College

|-
| style="text-align:left;"| 2019–20
| style="text-align:left;"| LSU
| 31 || 30 || 31.6 || .489 || .269 || .674 || 7.2 || 1.7 || .9 || .7 || 13.6
|-
| style="text-align:left;"| 2020–21
| style="text-align:left;"| LSU
| 28 || 28 || 34.6 || .480 || .316 || .651 || 7.4 || 2.9 || 1.1 || .6 || 16.3
|- class="sortbottom"
| style="text-align:center;" colspan="2"| Career
| 59 || 58 || 33.0 || .484 || .290 || .662 || 7.3 || 2.3 || 1.0 || .7 || 14.9

Personal life
Watford is the younger brother of professional basketball player Christian Watford.

References

External links
LSU Tigers bio
USA Basketball bio

2000 births
Living people
American men's basketball players
Basketball players from Birmingham, Alabama
LSU Tigers basketball players
McDonald's High School All-Americans
Portland Trail Blazers players
Power forwards (basketball)
Undrafted National Basketball Association players